Sylvania Northview High School is a public high school located in Sylvania, Ohio. It is a part of the Sylvania City School District. Northview currently has 1,348 students and 86 teachers.  It is the successor to Sylvania High School (19601976) and became Sylvania Northview in 1976 when a second high school in the district, Sylvania Southview, opened.

Extracurriculars

Science Olympiad 

 The Northview Science Olympiad team has been state-qualified for the past ten years.
 The team also hosts a yearly invitational that happens in early December or late November.

Quiz Bowl 

 The Northview Quiz Bowl team have won in its bracket and have attended multitude of both state and national events.

Band and Orchestra 

 The Northview Marching and Concert Bands are led by the combined leadership of Nathan Heath, the head Band Director, and Carter Adams, the assistant Band Director.
 Aside from the Marching Band, the concert bands consist of three levels, the lowest of which is Concert Band, followed by Symphonic band, and then the Wind Ensemble.
 In addition to the three concert bands, there are two levels of Jazz Band, the lower band is referred to as Jazz Cats, and the upper band is referred to as Jazz Band.
 Many members of the Northview Bands participate in honors bands around the state.
 The Northview Orchestra contains three orchestras, the lowest being the Concert Orchestra, followed by the Academy Orchestra, and then the Chamber Orchestra. The Orchestra Program is led by Anna Davis.

Theatre 

Northview's theatre program has sent many students to audition and participate in the All-Ohio show.

 The Laramie Project (2012)
 Rent (2013)
 Good 'n' Plenty (2014)

OhEdTA Northwest Area State Thespian Officer for seasons 20132014 and 20142015

Athletics

Soccer Team 

 The boys soccer team has won the league the past 4 years and has been ranked top 10 in the state the past two.

Ohio High School Athletic Association State Championships 

 Baseball - 2022
 Boys' Ice Hockey - 2012, 2014*
*Co-champs

Hijab Incident
In 2019 a student at a nearby Islamic school who played as part of Northview High School was disqualified from cross country regionals, after her coach failed to submit a waiver for her hijab, which was considered a uniform violation by district officials and defended by the Ohio High School Athletic Association. The incident attracted international attention, including a comment in support of the student from Elizabeth Warren. The OHSAA later went on to change their uniform rules due to the backlash from this incident.

Notable alumni

 Chip Davis, creator of Mannheim Steamroller
 Becky Minger, Miss Ohio 2010
 Scott Smith, author and screenwriter of A Simple Plan, and The Ruins.
 Oliver Cooper, Actor known for role in Project X
 Terry Cook, Former NASCAR driver
 Sandy Helberg, Film and TV actor
 Luke Fortner, NFL Prospect

References

High schools in Lucas County, Ohio
Public high schools in Ohio
1960 establishments in Ohio
Educational institutions established in 1960